KOOU 104.7 FM is a radio station licensed to Hardy, Arkansas.  The station broadcasts a country music format and is owned by KOOU, Incorporated.

Previous logo

References

External links

OOU
Adult standards radio stations in the United States